Das große Abenteuer des Kaspar Schmeck is an East German television film in three parts about Hessian mercenaries based on a novel by Grete Weishaupt.

See also
List of German television series

External links
 

1982 German television series debuts
1982 German television series endings
Television series set in the 18th century
Television series about the American Revolution
1980s German television miniseries
1980s German-language films
German-language television shows
Television in East Germany